Cambodia competed at the 1996 Summer Olympics in Atlanta, United States.  It was the first time the nation had participated in the Olympic Games in 24 years.

Athletics

Men

Women

Swimming 

Men

Women

Wrestling

Men's freestyle

References
Official Olympic Reports
sports-reference

Nations at the 1996 Summer Olympics
1996
Olympic Games